Captain Falcon is a 1958 French-Italian adventure film directed by Carlo Campogalliani and starring Lex Barker, Rossana Rory, and Massimo Serato. It has also been called a costume drama. The film is set in thirteenth century Italy where a tyrannical baron is confronted by a Robin Hood-style outlaw.

Cast

References

Bibliography

External links

1958 films
1950s historical adventure films
Italian historical adventure films
French historical adventure films
1950s Italian-language films
Films directed by Carlo Campogalliani
Films set in the 13th century
1950s Italian films
1950s French films